Kosta Tsonev  (10 June 1929 – 25 January 2012) was a Bulgarian actor starring in theatre, TV and cinema. He was born on 10 June 1929 in the capital of Bulgaria, Sofia. He studied at the National Academy for Theatre and Film Arts. He has been married three times: twice to Anahid Tacheva and then to his present wife Elena. He has a son, famed news reader Dimitar Tsonev, and a daughter. His second oldest brother was the late Vasil Tsonev, a dry witted satirist who wrote many books which have been published in several languages. His oldest brother was the late Iwan Tsonev (Iwan Zoneff) who moved to Australia in 1950s where he became one of the biggest property developers in South Australia during the mid 60's showing the diverse talents of the 3 brothers in each of their chosen fields. The father of the three brothers was a simple house painter.
In 2001 Tsonev turned to politics and was elected to the National Assembly of Bulgaria as a representative of the former National Movement Simeon II (now National Movement for Stability and Progress). He was reelected in 2005.

Full filmography

 Trade Routes (2007) as Alexander Georgiev
 Shantav den (2004) as Grandfather
in Bulgarian: Шантав ден

in English: Crazy Day (Europe: English title)
 Zhrebiyat (1993) as Boris Skarlatov
in Bulgarian: Жребият

in English: The Lot
 Kragovrat (1993) as Ivan Dimovski
in Bulgarian: Кръговрат

in English: Circle
 Zweite Tod des Gregor Z., Der (1992) as Simeon Boiovic
 Nemirnata ptitza lyubov (1990) as Svidetelyat
in Bulgarian: Немирната птица любов

in English: Love Is a Willful Bird
 Bashti i sinove (1990) TV Series
in Bulgarian: Бащи и синове

in English: Fathers and Sons
 Indianski igri (1990) as Angel
in Bulgarian: Индиански игри

in English: Indian Games
 Plemennikat chuzhdenetz (1990) as Stranger
in Bulgarian: Племенникът — чужденец

in English: The Foreign Nephew
 Razvodi, razvodi... (1989) as Mariya's husband
in Bulgarian: Разводи, разводи...

in English: Divorces, Divorces...
 Neizchezvashtite (1988) TV Series
in Bulgarian: Неизчезващите

in English: People, Who Never Disappear
 Slyapa sabota (1988) as Kosta Tsonev
in Bulgarian: Сляпа събота
in English: Blind Saturday
 Chicho Krastnik (1988)
in Bulgarian: Чичо Кръстник

in English: My Uncle Godfather
 Vchera (1988) as Vera's Dad
in English: Yesterday
 Dom za nashite deca (1987) TV Series as Hristo Aldanov
in Bulgarian: Дом за нашите деца

in English: Home for Our Children
 Nebe za vsichki (1987) as General director of the company
in Bulgarian: Небе за всички

in English: A Sky for All
 Vreme za pat (1987) TV Series as Hristo Aldanov
in Bulgarian: Време за път

in English: Time for Traveling (Europe: English title)
 Mechtateli (1987) as Georgi Zhivkov
in Bulgarian: Мечтатели

in English: Dreamers
 Eshelonite (1986) as Dimitar Peshev
in Bulgarian: Ешелоните на смъртта

in English: Transports of Death
 Gorski hora (1985)
in Bulgarian: Горски хора

in English: Forest People
 Porwanie (1985)
in English: Hijack
 Tazi hubava zryala vazrast (1985) as Rumen Iliev
in Bulgarian: Тази хубава зряла възраст

in English: This Fine Age of Maturity
 Boris I (1985) as Kliment Ohridski
in Bulgarian: Борис Първи

in English: The Conversion to Christianity & Discourse of Letters
 V poiskakh kapitana Granta (1985) (mini) TV Series as Hetzel
in Russian: В поисках капитана Гранта

in English: In Search for Captain Grant
 Spasenieto (1984) as Nikola Bakardzhiev
in Bulgarian: Спасението

in English: Salvation
 Falshifikatorat ot "Cherniya kos" (1983) TV Series
in Bulgarian: Фалшификаторът от `Черния кос`

in English: Faker from 'The Blackbird'
 Parizhskaya drama (1983)
 Pochti reviziya (1983) (mini) TV Series as Vakrilov
in Bulgarian: Почти ревизия

in English: Almost an Inspection
 Tzarska piesa (1982) as Alexander Tzanev, King' Adviser
in Bulgarian: Царска пиеса

in English: Royal Play
 Kristali (1982) as Akademik Abadzhiev
in Bulgarian: Кристали

in English: Crystals
 Udarat (1981) as Prince Kiril
in Bulgarian: Ударът

in English: The Thrust
 Milost za zhivite (1981) as Professor Andrey Haydutov
in Bulgarian: Милост за живите

in English: Mercy for the Living
 Sami sred valtzi (1979) TV Series as General Lukash
in Bulgarian: Сами сред вълци

in English: Alone Among Wolves
 Tayfuni s nezhni imena (1979) TV Series as Emil Boev
in Bulgarian: Тайфуни с нежни имена

in English: Typhoons with Gentle Names
 Po diryata na bezsledno izcheznalite (1979) TV Series
in Bulgarian: По дирята на безследно изчезналите

in English: On the Tracks of the Missing
 Umiray samo v kraen sluchay (1978) TV Series as Emil Boev
in Bulgarian: Умирай само в краен случай

in English: Dying in the Worst (
 Yuliya Vrevskaya (1978) as the old Rebel
in Bulgarian: Юлия Вревская
 Adios, muchachos (1978) as Vasil
in Bulgarian: Адиос, мучачос
 Baseynat (1977) as Apostol
in Bulgarian: Басейнът

in English: The Swimming Pool
 Godina ot ponedelnitzi (1977) as Anton Stamenov
in Bulgarian: Година от понеделници

in English: A Year of Mondays
 Dopalnenie kam zakona za zashtita na darzhavata (1976) as Yosif Herbst
in Bulgarian: Допълнение към закона за защита на държавата

in English: Amendment to the Defense-of-State Act
 Sinyata bezpredelnost (1976) as Emil Boev
in Bulgarian: Синята безпределност

in English: The Blue Infinity
 Rekviem za edna mrasnitza (1976) as Boev
in Bulgarian: Реквием за една мръсница

in English: Requiem for a Tramp
 Izgori, za da svetish (1976) TV Series as Pavel
in Bulgarian: Изгори, за да светиш
 Il pleut sur Santiago (1976)
in Bulgarian: Над Сантяго вали

in English: It Is Raining on Santiago
 Buna (1975)
in Bulgarian: Буна

in English: Riot
 Magistrala (1975) as Head Engineer
in Bulgarian: Магистрала

in English: A Highway
 Svatbite na Yoan Asen (1975) as Aleksander/Yoan Asen
in Bulgarian: Сватбите на Йоан Асен

in English: The Weddings of Tsar Ioan Assen
 Brazilska melodiya (1974)
in Bulgarian: Бразилска мелодия

in English: Brazilian Melody
 Bashta mi boyadzhiyata (1974) as the Father
in Bulgarian: Баща ми бояджията
 Golyamata skuka (1973) as Seymur, Uylyams
in Bulgarian: Голямата скука

in English: The Great Boredom
 Golyamata pobeda (1973) as Big Brother Bonev
in Bulgarian: Голямата победа

in English: The Great Victory
 Glutnitsata (1972) as Kalinov
in Bulgarian: Глутницата

in English: The Pack of Wolves
 Neobhodimiyat greshnik (1972) as Attorney Ivan Asenov
in Bulgarian: Необходимият грешник

in English: The Indispensable Sinner
 Na vseki kilometar — II (1971) TV Series
in Bulgarian: На всеки километър — втора част

in English: At Each Kilometer — II
 Gnevno patuvane (1971)
in Bulgarian: Гневно пътуване

in English: Wrathful Journey
 Demonat na imperiyata (1971) TV Series as Father Matey Preobrazhenski
in Bulgarian: Демонът на империята

in English: The Demon of the Empire
 Nyama nishto po-hubavo ot loshoto vreme (1971) as Evans
in Bulgarian: Няма нищо по-хубаво от лошото време

in English: There Is Nothing Finer Than Bad Weather
 Na vseki kilometar (1969) TV Series
in Bulgarian: На всеки километър

in English: At Each Kilometer
 Gospodin Nikoy (1969) as Emil Bobev
in Bulgarian: Господин Никой

in English: Mister Nobody
in USA Mr. Nobody
 Svoboda ili smart (1969) as Podvoyvodata
in Bulgarian: Свобода или смърт

in English: Freedom or Death

 Chovekat ot La Mancha (1968, TV musical) as Servantes / Don Quixote
in Bulgarian: Човекът от Ла Манча

in English: Man of La Mancha

 Smart nyama (1963) as Mladenov
in English: There Is No Death
 Zlatniyat zab (1962) as Captain Lukov
in Bulgarian: Златният зъб

in English: The Golden Tooth
 Noshtta sreshtu 13-i (1961) as Major Andrey Panov
in Bulgarian: Нощта срещу тринадесети

in English: On the Eve of the 13th
 Badi shtastliva, Ani! (1961) as Boyan
in Bulgarian: Бъди щастлива, Ани!

in English: Be Happy, Ani!
 Bednata ulitza (1960) as Petar
in Bulgarian: Бедната улица

in English: Poor Man's Street
 V tiha vecher (1960) as The captain
in Bulgarian: В тиха вечер
in English: On a Quiet Evening
 Komandirat na otryada (1959) as Danyo
in Bulgarian: Командирът на отряда

in English: The Commander of the Detachment
 Siromashka radost (1958) as Lazar Dabaka
in Bulgarian: Сиромашка радост

in English: Poor Man's Joy
 Dimitrovgradtsy (1956)
in Bulgarian: Димитровградци

in English: People of Dimitrovgrad

References

External links
 

1929 births
2012 deaths
20th-century Bulgarian male actors
21st-century Bulgarian male actors
Bulgarian actor-politicians
Bulgarian male film actors
Bulgarian male stage actors
Bulgarian male television actors
Members of the National Assembly (Bulgaria)
National Movement for Stability and Progress politicians
Male actors from Sofia